Peter Hon Jung Wong  (born 12 October 1942) is an Australian politician. A figure in the Sydney Chinese community and former member of the Liberal Party of Australia, he became concerned over the Liberal Party's refusal to oppose strongly the rise of Pauline Hanson and her One Nation Party, and ultimately went on to found the Unity Party. He served as their leader from 1998 to 1999 and represented the party in the New South Wales Legislative Council from March 1999 until March 2007. Wong was made a Member of the Order of Australia in 1996.

Early life

Wong was born in China, but his Hakka family fled from that Communist Party-controlled country when he was eight. His family briefly settled in Borneo, where his father provided free medical care to the poor, but they later moved on to Sydney, Australia. Wong ultimately studied medicine at the University of Sydney and went into private practice, working as a general practitioner in Sydney for many years. He became actively involved in the Chinese Australian community, which saw him appointed as a member of the Ethnic Affairs Commission from 1991 to 1997.

Wong became extensively involved in community work; amongst other things, he founded the Chinese Catholic Community, co-founded the Australian Chinese Charity Foundation (ACCF) and served as chair of the Chinese Migrant Welfare Association. He also co-founded the Welfare Committee for Chinese Students in 1990 and through it played a role in the Hawke government's eventual decision to give asylum to 42,000 Chinese university students after the Tiananmen Square protests of 1989. Through his work with these organisations, Wong often oversaw the provision of assistance to newly arrived migrants and the underprivileged in the Sydney Chinese community and acted as a spokesperson for the community in the media.

Initial concern about Hanson and One Nation

Wong was an active member of the Liberal Party of Australia for many years. He served as secretary of the party's Chinatown branch, acted as an advisor to Philip Ruddock and was a prominent supporter of federal MP Brendan Nelson and prominent candidate for Lord Mayor of Sydney Kathryn Greiner. However, after the 1996 federal election and 1998 Queensland state election, Wong became increasingly concerned about the rising popularity of controversial right-wing federal MP Pauline Hanson and her One Nation Party, who had run on a platform of reducing Asian immigration. When the Liberal Party did little to stop the growth of the Hanson movement and made clear their intention to preference One Nation over the opposition Australian Labor Party, Wong made his concern public, though he kept it relatively muted.

When the Liberal Party continued to insist on preferencing Hanson, Wong joined a number of Chinese community leaders in campaigning against the preference decision. Wong continued to be dissatisfied with the Liberal response, and on 24 June, he publicly resigned from the party, angrily criticising the party's refusal to more strongly oppose Hanson. His remarks received media attention, which was further amplified when Helen Sham-Ho, a Chinese Australian Liberal member of the New South Wales Legislative Council, also resigned from the party several days later.

Founding the Unity Party

With the 1998 election looming on the horizon, Wong initially planned to stand as an independent candidate. However, he was persuaded to look at starting a separate political party with the specific aim of opposing Hanson and promoting multiculturalism. Weeks of discussions with other ethnic leaders around the nation followed, and the result, the result, the Unity Party, was announced on 3 July 1998, with Wong as its first convener - in effect, leader.

Wong quickly set about finding candidates and members, as well as setting up branches in other states, and the new party saw rapid growth. He was particularly insistent that the new party must be multicultural, instead of representing one or two ethnic groups, and broke with Sham-Ho over the issue. For this reason, it was initially intended to find a non-Asian leader to broaden the party's appeal in advance of the 1998 federal election, but this never occurred, and Wong led the party into the election. While the Unity Party was notably liberal on race issues, Wong's conservatism was evident in their policies against abortion and voluntary euthanasia.

Wong chose not to run for office himself at the federal election, but the party fielded candidates in 72 of the 148 electorates. They fell well short of having any members elected, but had outpolled the Australian Democrats and Australian Greens in some lower house seats - although their main Senate ticket was nearly outpolled by the Christian Democratic Party in primary votes. With the election over, Wong and the Unity Party then turned their attention to the 1999 New South Wales state election, where the party had a greater chance of gaining representation in parliament, as their core base lay in the state.

Election to parliament

While he had not contested the federal election, Wong decided to run for the New South Wales Legislative Council at the state election, and took first place on the Unity Party ticket. With the threat from Pauline Hanson and One Nation largely gone, much of their original focus had changed, but Wong oversaw a change in party policy, focusing more on issues of multiculturalism and social justice. Wong's campaign gained significant publicity in Chinese-language newspapers and was often quoted in the mainstream media during the campaign.

However, only weeks before the election, a string of founding members resigned over Wong's decision to preference several right-wing parties despite having done little consultation with other members, and many of them also demanded that Wong resign as leader. This caused significant fallout for Wong and the Unity Party, and he subsequently polled only 1% of the vote on election day. Despite this, he still managed to win a seat in the Legislative Council, as due to an unusual effect of the electoral system, he managed to pick up a solid flow of preferences from other parties, several of whom were ideologically opposed to the Unity Party.

His election with such a low proportion of the vote - along with two others who gained less than 1% - caused some controversy and sparked a major overhaul of the state's electoral laws. He soon resigned as leader of the Unity Party in order to concentrate on his parliamentary responsibilities, and while he remained actively involved in the party, subsequently had little to do with their affairs outside of New South Wales.

Member of the Legislative Council

As a member of the Legislative Council, Wong generally tended to concentrate on ethnic and migrant issues. He attempted to minimise the influence of One Nation-turned-independent MLC David Oldfield, who argued for the elimination of all forms of government support for multiculturalism. He was often a spokesperson for the Chinese community in parliament, most often during an organised crime war involving Sydney's Chinatown in 2003 and during a government attempt to regulate the use of MSG in restaurants, which Wong successfully lobbied against after a wave of concern from Chinese restaurants.

Wong was sharply critical of policies he viewed as being anti-migrant, as seen when he strongly opposed the Carr government's decision to change the name of the Ethnic Affairs Commission to the Community Relations Commission - a move which he blamed on appeasing Pauline Hanson's supporters. He also attacked examples of what he perceives to be racist stereotyping, such as Premier Bob Carr's introduction of racial profiling in 2003, and comments by Carr that he blamed for inciting aggression against ethnic minorities in the wake of the Sydney gang rapes and a spate of other incidents involving gang-related crime.

While Wong had been known as a conservative when he was in the Liberal Party, he often espoused traditionally left-wing viewpoints in the Legislative Council. He voted to lower the age of consent for male homosexual sex, opposed the mandatory detention of refugees, often visiting detainees in Villawood Detention Centre and came out strongly against the 2003 invasion of Iraq. He has also been a vocal defender of the Palestinian people; a stance that caused Wong some controversy when Alan Jacobs, the Unity Party's national president, resigned and stormed out on the party after hearing him make anti-Israel comments in the Legislative Council. Jacobs also repeatedly accused Wong of being homophobic, though he provided no evidence of this. Voluntary euthanasia was the only marked exception to his otherwise generally liberal voting record; Wong strongly opposed it, and vocally campaigned against a failed attempt by the Greens to legalise voluntary euthanasia in New South Wales.

Wong had a number of major successes while in Parliament such as achieving the inquiry into Kariong Juvenile Justice Centre, stopping the major grocery companies expanding into drug sales as chemists, and was instrumental in bringing about the moratorium on genetically modified crop trials in NSW.

His work assisting Sydney Harbour fishermen led to the full closure of commercial fisheries in Port Jackson; the Government buyback of commercial fishing licences, a $5 million compensation package and the testing of the 44 commercial fishermen and their families for dioxin contamination.

The NSW Government also announced a massive additional cleanup of the sediments of Homebush Bay.

Dr. Wong was also a vocal champion for children in the care of the State (State wards), attempting unsuccessfully to have government address their massive overrepresentation in the juvenile and adult prison systems in NSW.

Dr. Wong's eight-year term expired in March 2007. He did not recontest his seat at the March NSW State election, and his party failed in their bid to secure his seat, achieving only 1.2% of the vote. Wong has been the only Unity representative to date to have secured a seat in an Australian parliament.

References

External links
 Personal website
 Unity Party website
 Australian Chinese Charity Foundation

1942 births
Living people
Members of the New South Wales Legislative Council
Liberal Party of Australia members of the Parliament of New South Wales
Unity Party (Australia) politicians
Members of the Order of Australia
Australian politicians of Chinese descent
People from Zijin
21st-century Australian politicians
Politicians from Heyuan